Cirrhicera is a genus of longhorn beetles of the subfamily Lamiinae, containing the following species:

 Cirrhicera basalis Gahan, 1892
 Cirrhicera championi Bates, 1881
 Cirrhicera cinereola Bates, 1881
 Cirrhicera conspicua Gahan, 1892
 Cirrhicera cristipennis Bates, 1881
 Cirrhicera leuconota (Laporte, 1840)
 Cirrhicera longifrons Bates, 1881
 Cirrhicera nigrina Thomson, 1857
 Cirrhicera niveosignata Thomson, 1860
 Cirrhicera panamensis Bates, 1885
 Cirrhicera sallei Thomson, 1857

References

Hemilophini